Eddy Merckx is widely considered to be the greatest bicycle racer in history. His eleven Grand Tour victories are the most ever, and he also won one of the classic cycle races 28 times, in addition to a prolific career as an amateur and on the track.

Career achievements

Major results
Limited list (only mentioning 1st places). Source:

Road 

1961
1st Petit-Enghien
1962
won 23 of 53 road races
National Road Championships – Junior road race
1963 (Amateur)
1st Rund um Sebnitz
1st Overall Tour of Limburg amateur race
1st Kampioenschap van Brabant (TTT)
1964 (Amateur)
1st  1964 UCI Road World Championships Amateur road race
1st Brussels-Opwijk
1st GP Affligem

1965 (Solo-Supéria)
1st GP Stad Vilvoorde
1st Omloop van het Houtland (Torhout)
1st Trofee Luc Van Biesen 
1st Kampioenschap van Brabant (TTT)
1st GP Itterbeek
1st Wezembeek-Oppem
1st Kessel-Lo
1st Critérium du Renaix
1st Nederbrakel
1st Critérium de Visé
1st Critérium de St. Jansteen

1966 (Team Peugeot–BP)
1st Trofeo Baracchi (with Ferdinand Bracke)
 1st  Overall Escalada a Montjuïc
1st Stage 1b
1st Circuit des Frontières
1st Kampioenschap van Vlaanderen
1st Geraardsbergen-Viane
1st Boucles de l'Aulne
1st Druivenkoers-Overijse
1st Overall Tour of Morbihan
 1st Stages 3 and 4 
 1st Stage 2 Grand Prix du Midi Libre
1st Wattrelos–Meulebeke
1st GP Pino Cerami
1st Milan–San Remo
1st Helchteren
1st Rousiès
1st Denderleeuw
1st Rumes
1st GP Le Télégramme à Châteaulin
1st Criterium de Puteaux

1967 (Team Peugeot–BP)
1st  Road race, UCI Road World Championships
1st Trofeo Baracchi (with Ferdinand Bracke)
1st Critérium des As
 1st Nationale Sluitingsprijs
 1st Stage 3 Paris–Luxembourg
1st Omloop der Zennevallei
 Giro d'Italia
1st Stages 12 & 14
1st Tour du Condroz
 1st La Flèche Wallonne
 1st Gent–Wevelgem
 1st Milan–San Remo
 Paris–Nice
1st Stages 2 & 6
 Giro di Sardegna
1st Stages 6 & 7
1st Critérium de Camors
1st GP Salvarani
1st GP du Tournaisis
1st Nandrin
1st Simpelveld
1st Enter
1st Liedekerkse Pijl
1st La Clayette
1st Critérium de La Panne
1st Critérium de st Lenaarts
1st Kampioenschap van Brabant
1st Critérium de Liedekerke
1st Critérium d'Armentières
1st Putte-Kapellen

1968 (Team Faema)

 1st  Overall À travers Lausanne
1st Stages 1a & 2a
 1st Gran Premio di Lugano
 1st  Overall Volta a Catalunya
1st Stages 1 & 6
1st Stage 3 (TTT) Paris–Luxembourg
 1st Tre Valli Varesine
 1st  Overall Giro d'Italia
1st  Points classification
1st  Mountains classification
1st Stages 1, 2, 8, & 12
 Winner Cima Coppi
 1st  Overall Tour de Romandie
1st Stage 1
 1st Paris–Roubaix
 1st Stage 2 Tour of Belgium
1st Stage 3 (ITT) Setmana Catalana de Ciclisme
1st Stage 3 (TTT) Paris–Nice
 1st  Overall Giro di Sardegna
1st Stages 1 & 5b
1st Rombano Lombardo
1st Salsiomaggiore
1st La Clayette
1st Bornem
1st Woluwé-St Lambert
1st La Panne
1st Ohain
1st Alsemberg
1st GP Malderen
1st Kampioenschap van Brabant
1st Roue d'Or
1st Trofeo Dicen

1969 (Team Faema)
 1st  Overall Tour de France
1st  Points classification
1st Mountains classification
1st  Combination classification
1st  Combativity award
1st Stages 1b (TTT), 6, 8a (ITT), 11, 15 (ITT), 17 & 22b (ITT)
1st Boucles de l'Aulne
 1st  Overall Paris–Luxembourg
1st Stage 2
 Giro d'Italia
1st Stages 3, 4 (ITT), 7 & 15 (ITT)
1st Wattrelos–Meulebeke
 1st Liège–Bastogne–Liège
 1st Stage 3 Vuelta a Mallorca
 1st Tour of Flanders
 1st Milan–San Remo
 1st  Overall Paris–Nice
1st Stages 2, 3b & 7b
1st Volta a la Comunitat Valenciana
 1st  Overall Vuelta a Levante
1st Points Classification
1st Stages 3, 4 & 5
1st Ronde du Carnaval d'Aix-en-Provence
1st La Roche-sur-Yon (with R. Lelangue & F. Mintjens)
1st La Trimouille
1st Ottignies
1st Critérium d'Alost
1st Critérium de Woluwé-St Lambert
1st Vincennes omnium
1st Guerlesquin Tro-Ker
1st Remiremont
1st Chateau-Chinon
1st Londerzeel Critérium
1st Saussignac
1st Moorslede Critérium
1st Auvelais Critérium
1st Schaerbeek
1st Alès
1st Circuit de l'Aulne a Châteaulin
1st Scorze
1st G. P. de Wallonie a Charleroi individuelle
1st Coupe du Monde intermarques
 1st Overall Super Prestige Pernod International

1970 (Team Faema-Faemino)
 1st  Road race, National Road Championships
 1st  Overall Tour de France
1st Mountains classification
1st  Combination classification
1st  Combativity award
1st Prologue (ITT) & Stages 3 (TTT), 7a, 10, 11a (ITT), 12, 14, 20b (ITT) & 23 (ITT)
 1st  Overall Giro d'Italia
1st Combination classification
1st Stages 2, 7 & 9
 1st  Overall À travers Lausanne
1st Stage 2
1st Coppa Ugo Agostoni
 1st Critérium des As
 1st  Overall Escalada a Montjuïc
1st Stage 2 (ITT)
1st Stage 1 Puy-de-Dôme
 1st GP Union Dortmund
 1st La Flèche Wallonne
 1st Paris–Roubaix
 1st  Overall Tour of Belgium
1st  Points Classification
1st Stages 1b & 3b
 1st Gent–Wevelgem
 1st  Overall Paris–Nice
1st  Points classification
1st Mountains classification
Winner Combativity award
1st Stages 3, 7b & 8b
Giro di Sardegna
1st Stages 2 & 5
1st Sanary
1st Col San Martino
1st Lorient
1st Villafranca
1st Caen
1st Critérium de Renxaix
Critérium de Woluwé-St Lambert
1st Overall
1st Time Trial
1st Ronde de Seignelay
1st Vailly-sur-Sauldre
1st Saint-Cyprien Critérium
1st Bilzen Critérium
1st St. Niklaas Critérium
1st Baussières
1st Varilhes
1st Castelfranco
1st Chateaugiron
1st Bastia
1st Eeklo cyclo-cross (with Roger De Vlaeminck)
 1st Overall Super Prestige Pernod International

1971 (Team Molteni)
1st  Road race, UCI Road World Championships
 1st  Overall Tour de France
1st  Points classification
1st  Combination classification
1st Stages 2, 13 (ITT), 17 & 20 (ITT)
 1st Giro di Lombardia
 1st LuK Challenge Chrono (with Herman Vanspringel)
 1st  Overall Escalada a Montjuïc
1st Stages 1 & 2
 1st Stadsprijs Geraardsbergen
 1st Geraardsbergen-Viane
 1st Stage 3 Cronostafetta
 1st Gran Premio Città di Camaiore
 1st  Overall Grand Prix du Midi Libre
 1st Stages 1 & 2 
 1st  Overall Critérium du Dauphiné Libéré
 1st Stages 1 (TTT), 2 & 7
 1st Eschborn–Frankfurt
 1st Liège–Bastogne–Liège
 1st  Overall Tour of Belgium
1st  Points Classification
1st Stages 1 (ITT), 2 & 4
 1st Omloop Het Volk
 1st Milan–San Remo
 1st  Overall Paris–Nice
1st Prologue, Stages 1, 2b (ITT) & 7b (ITT)
 1st  Overall Giro di Sardegna
1st Stages 1, 3 & 7
 1st Rund um den Henninger Turm
 1st Overall Super Prestige Pernod International

1972 (Team Molteni)
 1st  Overall Tour de France
1st  Points classification
1st  Combination classification
1st Prologue, Stages 5b (ITT), 8, 13, 14a & 20a (ITT)
 1st  Overall Giro d'Italia
1sr Stages 12a (ITT), 14, 16 & 19b (ITT)
 Hour record  – 49.431 km
 1st  Overall À travers Lausanne
1st Stages 1a & 2a
 1st Giro di Lombardia
 1st Giro dell'Emilia
 1st  Overall Escalada a Montjuïc
1st Stages 1 & 2
 1st Giro del Mendrisio
 1st Giro del Piemonte
 1st GP Union Dortmund
 1st Scheldeprijs
 1st Prix de Momignies
 1st La Flèche Wallonne
 1st Liège–Bastogne–Liège
 1st Brabantse Pijl
 1st Milan–San Remo
 2nd Overall Paris–Nice
1st Prologue, Stages 2 & 6
 1st Trofeo Baracchi, with Roger Swerts
 1st Challenge Gan
 1st Overall Super Prestige Pernod International

1973 (Team Molteni)
 1st  Overall À travers Lausanne
1st Stages 1a & 2a
 1st Grand Prix des Nations
 1st Paris–Brussels
 1st Overall Grand Prix de Fourmies
1st Stage 1
 1st Stage 1 Cronostafetta
 1st Ronde van Oost-Vlaanderen
 1st  Overall Giro d'Italia
1st  Points classification
1st Combination classification
1st Prologue, Stages 1, 4, 8, 10 & 18
 1st  Overall Vuelta a España
1st  Points classification
1st  Combined classification
1st Sprints classification
1st Prologue, Stages 8, 10, 15b (ITT), 16 & 17b (ITT)
 1st Liège–Bastogne–Liège
 1st Paris–Roubaix
 1st Amstel Gold Race
 1st Gent–Wevelgem
 1st Prologue Paris–Nice
 1st Omloop Het Volk
 1st  Overall Giro di Sardegna
1st Stage 4
 1st Trofeo Laigueglia
 1st Overall Course de côte de Montecampione
 1st Challenge Gan
 1st Overall Super Prestige Pernod International

1974 (Team Molteni)
 1st  Road race, UCI Road World Championships
 1st  Overall Tour de France
1st  Combination classification
1st  Combativity award
1st Prologue, Stages 7, 9, 10, 15, 19b (ITT), 21a & 22
 1st  Overall Escalada a Montjuïc
1st Stages 1 & 2
 1st Critérium des As
 1st  Overall Tour de Suisse
1st  Points classification
1st  Mountains classification
1st Prologue, Stages 3 & 11 (ITT)
 1st  Overall Giro d'Italia
1st Stages 12 (ITT) & 21
1st Grand Prix de Momignies
 1st  Overall Setmana Catalana de Ciclisme
 1st Points classification 
 1st Mountains classification 
1st Prologue & Stage 1 Paris–Nice 
 1st  Overall Escalada a Montjuïc
1st GP Malderen
 1st Trofeo Laigueglia
 1st Challenge Gan
 1st Overall Super Prestige Pernod International

1975 (Team Molteni)
 1st  Overall Escalada a Montjuïc
1st ITT & TTT with Lucien Van Impe
 1st Druivenkoers Overijse
 1st Boucles de l'Aulne
 2nd Overall Tour de France
1st  Combativity award
1st Stages 6 (ITT) & 9b (ITT)
 2nd Overall Tour de Suisse
 1st Stage 8
 Tour de Romandie
1st  Points classification
 1st Stage 6
 1st Liège–Bastogne–Liège
 1st Tour of Flanders
 1st  Overall Setmana Catalana de Ciclisme
 1st Stage 4
 1st Amstel Gold Race
 1st Milan–San Remo
 2nd Overall Paris–Nice
 1st Prologue & Stage 5
 1st Classica Sarda
 1st  Overall Giro di Sardegna
 1st Stage 2
 1st Overall Super Prestige Pernod International
1st Sassari-Cagliari

1976 (Team Molteni)
 1st Ronde van West-Vlaanderen
 1st Omloop van de Westkust-De Panne
 1st Prologue (TTT) Tour de Romandie
 1st Omloop Leiedal
 1st Overall Setmana Catalana de Ciclisme
 1st Prologue & Stage 4 (ITT)
 1st Milan–San Remo
 2nd Overall Tirreno–Adriatico
1st  Mountains classification
 1st Stage 2
1977 (Team Fiat)
4th Overall Tour de France
 1st Stage 9 (TTT)
 1st Stage 7 Tour de Suisse
1st Tour du Condroz
 1st Stage 5 Paris–Nice
 1st  Overall Tour Méditerranéen

Track 

1963
1st  National Amateur Championships, Madison (with Patrick Sercu)
1964
1st  National Amateur Championships, Madison (with Patrick Sercu)
1965
1st  National Amateur Championships, Madison (with Patrick Sercu)
1st Six Days of Ghent (with Patrick Sercu)
1st Rocourt Madison
1966
1st  National Championships Madison (with Patrick Sercu)
1st Roubaix Omnium
1st Brussels Omnium (with Rik Van Looy and Edward Sels)
1st Antwerpen individual
1967
1st  National Championships Madison (with Patrick Sercu)
1st Six Days of Ghent (with Patrick Sercu)
1st Gent Omnium (with Edward Sels & Rik Van Looy)
1st Aulnay-sous-Blois omnium (with Ferdinand Bracke)
1st Milan Omnium
1st Ostende Madison (with Patrick Sercu)
1st Rocourt Madison (with Patrick Sercu)
1st Antwerpen Omnium
1st Gent Omnium (with Daniel Van Ryckeghem)
1st Madrid Madison (with Jan Janssen)
1st Antwerpen Omnium (with Patrick Sercu)
1st Rocourt Omnium (with Patrick Sercu)
1st Ostende Omnium (with Patrick Sercu)
1st Brussels Omnium (24 October) (with Patrick Sercu)
1st Gent Omnium (1 November) (with Walter Godefroot)
1st Gent Omnium (7 November) (with Rik Van Steenbergen, Patrick Sercu, & Noël Van Clooster)
1st Brussels Omnium (15 November) (with Rik Van Steenbergen)
1st Lorient Omnium (Rudi Altig, Tom Simpson, & Howling)
1st Roubaix Omnium
1st Ostende Omnium (with Patrick Sercu)
1st Gent Omnium (with Ferdinand Bracke)

1968
1st Six Days of Charleroi (with Ferdinand Bracke)
1st Antwerpen Omnium
1st Gent Omnium (with Patrick Sercu)
1st Antwerpen Omnium (with Rik Van Looy)
1st Milan Omnium (with Vittorio Adorni)
1st Rocourt Omnium
1st Ostende Omnium (with Patrick Sercu)
1st Ostende Omnium
1st Rocourt Omnium
1st Milan Omnium (with Rudi Altig, Lucien Aimar, & Jean Jourdan)
1st Rome Omnium (with Vittorio Adorni
1st Milan Pursuit
1st Milan Omnium (with Rudi Altig)
1st Gent Omnium (with Guido Reybrouck)

1969
1st  European Track Championships – Madison (with Patrick Sercu)
1st Gent Omnium (with Roger De Vlaeminck & Walter Godefroot)
1st Antwerpen Omnium
1st Rome Omnium
1st Ostende Omnium
1st Antwerpen Omnium (with Jacques Anquetil, Rudi Altig & Harm Ottenbros)
1st Gent Omnium (with Julien Stevens)
1st Gand Omnium (with Roger De Vlaeminck)
1st Charleroi Omnium (with Ferdinand Bracke)
1st Critérium d'Europe Madison in Cologne (with Patrick Sercu)
1970
1st Antwerpen Omnium (with Julien Stevens)
1st Charleroi Omnium
1st Charleroi Madison (with Julien Stevens)
1st Grenoble Omnium
1st Milan Omnium (with Jean-Pierre Monseré)
1971
1st Six Days of Milan
Vincennes Omnium
1972
1st Gent Omnium (with Walter Godefroot and Patrick Sercu)
1973
1st  National Championships Madison (with Patrick Sercu)
1st Six Days of Dortmund (with Patrick Sercu)
1st Six Days of Grenoble (with Patrick Sercu)
1st Oostende Omnium
1st Gent Omnium
1974
1st Six Days of Antwerp (with Patrick Sercu) 
1st Genève Omnium
1st Luxembourg Omnium
1st Rotterdam Omnium
1st Madrid Omnium
1975
1st  European Track Championships – Omnium
1st  National Championships Madison (with Patrick Sercu)
 1st Six Days of Ghent (with Patrick Sercu)
1st Six Days of Antwerp (with Patrick Sercu) 
1st Six Days of Grenoble (with Patrick Sercu)
1st Genève Omnium
1st Zürich Omnium
1st Antwerp Omnium
1st Valkenburg Omnium
1976
1st  National Championships Madison (with Patrick Sercu)
1st Six Days of Antwerp (with Patrick Sercu) 
1st Six Days of Rotterdam (with Patrick Sercu)
1st Marseille Omnium
1st Antwerp Omnium (with Rik Van Linden) 
1st Gent Omnium
1st Vincennes Omnium
1977
1st  European Track Championships – Madison (with Patrick Sercu)
 1st Six Days of Munich (with Patrick Sercu)
 1st Six Days of Zürich (with Patrick Sercu)
 1st Six Days of Ghent (with Patrick Sercu)
 1st Six Days of Maastricht (with Patrick Sercu)
 1st Six Days of Berlin (with Patrick Sercu)
1978
1st Zürich Omnium (with Patrick Sercu)

Grand Tour general classification and World Championships results 

Source:

Monuments results timeline
Source:

Major stage race general classification results timeline
Source:

Win rate
In his best year, Merckx won almost every other race he rode. Merckx won the equivalent of a race a week for six years. This table shows his strike rate of wins as a percentage of races undertaken.

Overall: 1808 races entered, 525 wins for a win rate of 29%.

1961–1964: Amateur results. 5 of the 74 races in 1965 were as amateur, of which 4 were won.

Records

Road 
See Eddy Merckx Records Overview

Track 

 17 Six-day races, of which 15 with Patrick Sercu.
 3 European championships (Omnium: 1975 Madison: 1969, 1977)
 8 Belgian Madison championships with Patrick Sercu: 1963, 1964, 1965, 1966, 1967, 1973, 1975 & 1976

World record

References

Merckx
Career achievements